The Last Lord (Italian: L'ultimo lord) is a 1926 Italian silent comedy film directed by Augusto Genina.

It is based on the 1925 play of the same title by Ugo Falena. Genina remade the play as a sound film in 1932. A further adaptation The Twentieth Duke was released in 1945.

Cast
In alphabetical order
 Oreste Bilancia 
 Carmen Boni 
 Bonaventura Ibáñez 
 Arnold Kent
 Carlo Tedeschi 
 Gianna Terribili-Gonzales

References

Bibliography
 Stewart, John. Italian Film: A Who's Who. McFarland, 1994.

External links

1926 films
1920s Italian-language films
Films based on works by Frances Hodgson Burnett
Films directed by Augusto Genina
Italian silent feature films
1926 comedy films
Italian comedy films
Italian black-and-white films
Silent comedy films
1920s Italian films